Wormald is a surname. Notable people with the surname include:

Three English cricketers:
 Alfred Wormald (1855–1940)
 Edward Wormald (1848–1928)
 Philip Wormald (b. 1963)

Two British historians:
 Jenny Wormald (1948-2015)
 Patrick Wormald (1947–2004)

Other well-known people:
 Kevin Wormald, (b. 1996) Chilean weightlifter
 Ethel Wormald (1901–1993), English politician
 Frank Wormald (1868–1915), English soldier
 Kenny Wormald (b. 1984), American dancer and actor
 Leslie Wormald (1890–1965), English rower
 Nick Wormald, (b. ?) Australian mathematician
 Steven Wormald (b. 1946), Canadian-British Antarctic explorer and meteorologist
 Thomas Wormald (1802–1873), English surgeon
Chris Wormald (b.1968) English civil servant

See also
 Wormald Ice Piedmont, a peak on Adelaide Island, near Antarctica
 Wormald International, formerly Wormald Brothers, an Australian company